Theretra radiosa is a moth of the  family Sphingidae.

Distribution 
It is known from Papua New Guinea and Queensland.

References

Theretra
Moths described in 1916